Forbidden City Tour is an East Coast Music Award (ECMA)-winning album by the New Brunswick Youth Orchestra (NBYO), released in 2007 (see 2007 in music). It was recorded in summer of 2007 at the Forbidden City in Beijing, China and released on October 28, 2007 at Fredericton High School and is the third album released by the youth orchestra. All tracks were conducted by principal conductor Dr. James Mark.

Track listing

Awards and nominations
Forbidden City Tour won an East Coast Music Award in 2008 for the Classical Recording of the Year category. The orchestra opened the 2008 show.

References

2007 classical albums
New Brunswick Youth Orchestra albums